Krbeta is a village in the municipality of Brčko, Bosnia and Herzegovina.

Demographics 
According to the 2013 census, its population was 175.

References

Villages in Brčko District